Vabicaserin (codenamed SCA-136) was a novel antipsychotic and anorectic under development by Wyeth. As of 2010 it is no longer in clinical trials for the treatment of psychosis. It was also under investigation as an antidepressant but this indication appears to have been dropped as well.

Vabicaserin acts as a selective 5-HT2C receptor full agonist (Ki = 3 nM; EC50 = 8 nM; IA = 100% (relative to 5-HT)) and 5-HT2B receptor antagonist (IC50 = 29 nM). It is also a very weak antagonist at the 5-HT2A receptor (IC50 = 1,650 nM), though this action is not clinically significant. By activating 5-HT2C receptors, vabicaserin inhibits dopamine release in the mesolimbic pathway, likely underlying its efficacy in alleviating positive symptoms of schizophrenia, and increases acetylcholine and glutamate levels in the prefrontal cortex, suggesting benefits against cognitive symptoms as well.

See also 
 Lorcaserin
 WAY-163909

References 

Antiobesity drugs
Antipsychotics
Benzodiazepines
Quinolines
Serotonin receptor agonists
Cyclopentanes